Javier Carrasquillo Cruz (born September 20, 1964) is a Puerto Rican politician and former mayor of Cidra. He earned a BA in criminal justice from the Interamerican University of Puerto Rico. Carrasquillo is affiliated with the New Progressive Party (PNP) and served as mayor from 2013 to 2021. After losing his seat in the 2020 elections, Carrasquillo went on to work under elected governor Pedro Pierluisi as Auxiliar Secretary of Government. In February 2022, he was also appointed as President of the Special Communities Perpetual Escrow (Fideicomiso Perpetuo para las Comunidades Especiales), which oversees resources for low income communities in the island.

References

Living people
Interamerican University of Puerto Rico alumni
Mayors of places in Puerto Rico
New Progressive Party (Puerto Rico) politicians
People from Cidra, Puerto Rico
United States Army soldiers
1964 births